The 1938 Macdonald Brier, the Canadian men's national curling championship, was held from February 28 to March 3, 1938 at the Granite Club in Toronto, Ontario.

Team Manitoba, who was skipped by Ab Gowanlock finished round robin play unbeaten with a 9-0 record becoming only the third team to win the Brier with an undefeated record. This was also Manitoba's eighth Brier championship overall. The defending Brier champions, the Cliff Manahan rink of Alberta finished runner-up with an 8-1 record as their only loss came to Manitoba.

Teams
The teams are listed as follows:

Round Robin standings

Round Robin results

Draw 1

Draw 2

Draw 3

Draw 4

Draw 5

Draw 6

Draw 7

Draw 8

Draw 9

References 

Macdonald Brier, 1938
Macdonald Brier, 1938
The Brier
Curling in Toronto
Macdonald Brier
Macdonald Brier
Macdonald Brier
1930s in Toronto